The Syrian pound or lira (abbreviation: LS or SP in Latin, ل.س in Arabic, historically also £S, and £Syr;  ISO code: SYP) is the currency of Syria. It is issued by the Central Bank of Syria. The pound is nominally divided into 100 piastres ( qirsh, plural قروش qurūsh in Arabic, abbreviated to ), although piastre coins are no longer issued.

Before 1947, the Arabic inscription of the word "qirsh" was spelled with the initial Arabic letter غ, after which the word began with ق. Until 1958, banknotes were issued with Arabic on the obverse and French on the reverse. Since 1958, English has been used on the reverses, hence the three different names for this currency. Coins used both Arabic and French until independence, then only Arabic.

History 

During the period when Syria was a part of the Ottoman Empire, which lasted about 400 years, the Ottoman pound was its main currency. Following the fall of the Ottoman Empire and the placing of Syria under a mandate (French occupation), the Egyptian pound was used in the territories under French and British mandates, including Lebanon, Transjordan and Palestine. Upon taking Lebanon and Syria under its separate mandate, the French government sought to replace the Egyptian currency and granted a commercial bank, the Banque de Syrie (a French affiliate of the Ottoman Bank), the authority to issue a currency for territories under its new mandate.

As the political status of Lebanon evolved, the Banque de Syrie, which was to act as the official bank for Lebanon and Syria, was renamed the Banque de Syrie et du Grand-Liban (BSL). BSL issued the Syro-Lebanese pound for 15 years, starting in 1924. Two years before the expiration of the 15-year period, BSL split the Lebanese-Syrian currency into two separate currencies that could still be used interchangeably in either state. In 1939, the bank was renamed the Banque de Syrie et du Liban.

In 1941, the peg to the French franc was replaced by a peg to sterling of LS 8.83125 = £1, as a consequence of the occupation of Syria by British and Free French forces. This rate was based on the pre-war conversion rate between the franc and sterling. In 1946, following devaluation of the franc, the pound was pegged once again to the franc at a rate of LS 1 = 54.35 F. In 1947, Syria joined the International Monetary Fund (IMF) and pegged its currency to the U.S. dollar at LS 2.19148 = US$1, a rate which was maintained until 1961. The Lebanese and Syrian currencies split in 1948. From 1961, a series of official exchange rates were in operation, alongside a parallel, black market rate which reflected the true market rate for Syrian pounds in Jordan and Lebanon where there was a healthy trade in the Syrian currency. The market was allowed to flourish because everybody, including government and public sector companies, needed it. The black market rate diverged dramatically from the official rate in the 1980s. In July 2007, the currency was pegged to the IMF SDR (Special Drawing Rights).

Syrian Civil War 

There was a capital flight to nearby countries, including Lebanon, Jordan, Egypt and Turkey, as a result of the Syrian Civil War that started in 2011. In addition, Syria has been subject to sanctions imposed by the United States, the European Union and other countries, which shut Syria out of the global financial system. To circumvent the sanctions, Syrians effected foreign transactions through banks in neighbouring countries, especially Lebanon. As a result, the official exchange rate has deteriorated significantly, falling from LS 47 = US$1 in March 2011 to LS 515 = US$1 in July 2017.

On 31 October 2019, Syrian President Bashar Al-Assad mentioned in an interview that:

Exchange rate
On 5 December 2005, the selling rate quoted by the Commercial Bank of Syria was LS 48.4 = US$1. A rate of about LS 50 to US$1 was usual in the early 2000s, but the rate is subject to fluctuations. Since the start of the civil war in 2011, the pound's unofficial exchange rate has deteriorated significantly. It was LS 47 = US$1 in March 2011 and LS 515 in July 2017. Since July 2007, the Syrian pound has been pegged to the IMF SDR (Special Drawing Rights).

On 29 November 2019, following the Lebanese protests,  the black market rate was LS 765 = US$1, a decrease of 30% since the turmoil started in Lebanon a month earlier, as the protests led Lebanese banks to impose tight controls on hard currency withdrawals and transfers abroad, making it hard for Syrians to access funds held by them in those banks.

The black-market rate fell to LS 950 on 2 December 2019, another 25% decrease, while the official rate set by the central bank was LS 434 = US$1.

On 13 January 2020, the currency deteriorated further, as more than LS 1,000 was traded for US$1 in the black market, despite being valued at LS 434 = US$1 by the Syrian Central Bank. During the COVID-19 pandemic in Syria, the Syrian pound continued to fall against the U.S. dollar in the black market, where US$1 equaled more than LS 1,600 in May 2020. A month later, the Syrian pound passed LS 2,000 against the dollar, and a few days later, it passed LS 3,000 against the dollar.

Upon the implementation of the U.S. sanctions related to the Caesar Act, anti-government local authorities in Idlib Governorate adopted the Turkish lira in place of the plummeting Syrian pound. Turkish lira has also replaced Syrian pound in other Turkish occupied areas of northern Syria, such as Afrin and Jarablus.

On 3 March 2021, the Syrian pound hit a new record low on the black market, where US$1 bought LS 4,000, affected by a new low of Lebanese pound which hit LL 10,000 to the dollar. By June 2021, the Syrian pound was around LS 3,150 to the dollar.

On 31 December 2022, the Syrian pound hit a new record low again on the black market, where US$1 bought LS 7150, decreasing 100% of its value in 2022.

As of February 24th, the official Exchange rate is LS 7,000 to US$1, where as in the black markets it is LS 7,400 to US$1

Coins
In 1921, cupro-nickel  piastre coins were introduced, followed in 1926 by aluminium bronze 2p and 5p. In 1929, holed, nickel-brass 1pt and silver 10p, 25p and 50p were introduced. Nickel-brass pt coins were introduced 1935, followed by zinc 1pt and aluminium-bronze pt in 1940. During the Second World War, brass 1pt and aluminium p emergency coins were issued. These pieces were crudely produced and undated.

A new coinage was introduced between 1947 and 1948 in denominations of p, 5p, 10p, 25p, 50p and LS 1, with the p, 5p and 10p struck in cupro-nickel and the others in silver. Aluminium-bronze replaced cupro-nickel in 1960, with nickel replacing silver in 1968. In 1996, following high inflation, new coins were introduced in denominations of LS 1, LS 2, LS 5, LS 10 and LS 25, with the LS 25 being bimetallic. In 2003, LS 5, LS 10, and LS 25 coins were issued, with latent images. On December 26, 2018, the Central Bank of Syria introduced a LS 50 coin for general circulation to replace the banknote of that denomination.

Banknotes

In 1919, the Banque de Syrie introduced notes for 5p, 25p and 50p, LS 1 and LS 5. These were followed, in 1920, by notes for LS 1, LS 10, LS 25, LS 50 and LS 100. In 1925, the Banque de Syrie et du Grand-Liban began issuing notes and production of denominations below 25p ceased. Notes below LS 1 were not issued from 1930. In 1939, the issuing body again changed its name, to the Banque de Syrie et du Liban.

Between 1942 and 1944, the government introduced notes for 5p, 10p, 25p and 50p. In the early 1950s, undated notes were issued by the Institut d'Emission de Syrie in denominations of LS 1, LS 5, LS 10, LS 25, LS 50 and LS 100, followed by notes dated 1955 for LS 10 and LS 25. The Banque Centrale de Syrie took over paper money issuance in 1957, issuing the same denominations as the Institut d'Emission.

In 1958, the French language was removed from banknotes and replaced by English. Notes were issued for LS 1, LS 5, LS 10, LS 25, LS 50, LS 100 and LS 500. In 1966, the design of the LS 25, LS 50, and LS 100 notes were changed. In 1976 and 1977, the designs changed for all the denominations except the LS 500 note. 

In 1997 and 1998, a new series of notes was introduced in denominations of LS 50, LS 100, LS 200, LS 500 and LS 1,000, with the lower denominations replaced by coins. In 2009, the LS 50, LS 100, and LS 200 pound notes were changed with an entirely new design.
On 2 July 2014, a new LS 500 note was introduced, followed by a LS 1,000 note on 30 July 2015, a LS 2,000 note on 2 July 2017, and a LS 5,000 note on 24 January 2021.

2010 series
On 27 July 2010, the Central Bank of Syria issued a new series of banknotes dated 2009 in denominations of LS 50, LS 100, and LS 200. The notes were designed by Austrian banknote designer Robert Kalina.
The Central Bank of Syria issued new LS 500 and LS 1,000 notes in 2014 and 2015, respectively. The reverse of the new LS 1,000 note features an image of a Roman mosaic painting discovered in Deir al-Adas. President Bashar al-Assad was added to the LS 2,000 note in 2017. A LS 5,000 note was released in January 2021.

See also
 Economy of Syria

from Lira news: USD TRY

References

Notes

External links
 Historical banknotes of Syria 
 Syrian Pound Today
 Syrian Pound Today

Currencies introduced in 1919
Pound, Syrian